The Greece women's national volleyball team represents Greece in international women's volleyball competitions and friendly matches. The team first competed on the highest level at the 1985 European Championship, finishing in 12th place.

Results

Olympic Games
2004 — 10th place

World Championship
 1952 to 1998 — did not qualify
 2002 — 11th place
 2006 to 2022 — did not qualify

World Grand Prix
 2004 — did not qualify

European Championship
 1949 to 1983 — did not qualify
 1985 — 12th place
 1987 — did not qualify
 1989 — did not qualify
 1991 — 8th place
 1993 — 9th place
 1995 to 1999 — did not qualify
 2001 — 9th place
 2003 to 2017 — did not qualify
 2019 — 14th place
 2021 — 22nd place
 2023 — Qualified

European League
 2009 — 7th place
 2010 — 7th place
 2012 — 10th place
 2014 — 8th place
 2015 — 3rd place
 2016 — 3rd place
 2017 — did not qualify
 2018 — did not qualify
 2019 — 15th place
 2020 — cancelled
 2021 — did not qualify
 2022 — did not qualify

Team 
The following is the Greek roster in the 2019 European Championship.

Head Coach:  Guillermo Naranjo Hernandez

Notable Roster
 2004 Summer Olympics — 9th Place
Zanna Proniadu, Maria Gkaragkouni, Niki Gkaragkouni, Eleni Memetzi, Charikleia Sakkoula, Eleftheria Chatzinikou, Ioanna Vlachou, Vasiliki Papazoglou, Sofia Iordanidou, Georgia Tzanaki, Eleni Kiosi and Rouxantra-Kon Ntoumitreskou. Head coach:   Dimitrios Floros.

References

External links
Official website
FIVB profile

Videos
 Greece women's national volleyball team 2019 (Youtube.com video) 

National women's volleyball teams
Volleyball in Greece
Volleyball